Artificial intelligence (AI) is intelligence—perceiving, synthesizing, and inferring information—demonstrated by machines, as opposed to intelligence displayed by non-human animals and humans. Example tasks in which this is done include speech recognition, computer vision, translation between (natural) languages, as well as other mappings of inputs.

AI applications include advanced web search engines (e.g., Google Search), recommendation systems (used by YouTube, Amazon, and Netflix), understanding human speech (such as Siri and Alexa), self-driving cars (e.g., Waymo), generative or creative tools (ChatGPT and AI art), automated decision-making, and competing at the highest level in strategic game systems (such as chess and Go).

As machines become increasingly capable, tasks considered to require "intelligence" are often removed from the definition of AI, a phenomenon known as the AI effect. For instance, optical character recognition is frequently excluded from things considered to be AI, having become a routine technology.

Artificial intelligence was founded as an academic discipline in 1956, and in the years since it has experienced several waves of optimism, followed by disappointment and the loss of funding (known as an "AI winter"), followed by new approaches, success, and renewed funding. AI research has tried and discarded many different approaches, including simulating the brain, modeling human problem solving, formal logic, large databases of knowledge, and imitating animal behavior. In the first decades of the 21st century, highly mathematical and statistical machine learning has dominated the field, and this technique has proved highly successful, helping to solve many challenging problems throughout industry and academia.

The various sub-fields of AI research are centered around particular goals and the use of particular tools. The traditional goals of AI research include reasoning, knowledge representation, planning, learning, natural language processing, perception, and the ability to move and manipulate objects. General intelligence (the ability to solve an arbitrary problem) is among the field's long-term goals. To solve these problems, AI researchers have adapted and integrated a wide range of problem-solving techniques, including search and mathematical optimization, formal logic, artificial neural networks, and methods based on statistics, probability, and economics. AI also draws upon computer science, psychology, linguistics, philosophy, and many other fields.

The field was founded on the assumption that human intelligence "can be so precisely described that a machine can be made to simulate it". This raised philosophical arguments about the mind and the ethical consequences of creating artificial beings endowed with human-like intelligence; these issues have previously been explored by myth, fiction, and philosophy since antiquity. Computer scientists and philosophers have since suggested that AI may become an existential risk to humanity if its rational capacities are not steered towards beneficial goals. The term artificial intelligence has also been criticized for overhyping AI's true technological capabilities.

History 

Artificial beings with intelligence appeared as storytelling devices in antiquity, and have been common in fiction, as in Mary Shelley's Frankenstein or Karel Čapek's R.U.R. These characters and their fates raised many of the same issues now discussed in the ethics of artificial intelligence.

The study of mechanical or "formal" reasoning began with philosophers and mathematicians in antiquity. The study of mathematical logic led directly to Alan Turing's theory of computation, which suggested that a machine, by shuffling symbols as simple as "0" and "1", could simulate any conceivable act of mathematical deduction. This insight that digital computers can simulate any process of formal reasoning is known as the Church–Turing thesis. This, along with concurrent discoveries in neurobiology, information theory and cybernetics, led researchers to consider the possibility of building an electronic brain. The first work that is now generally recognized as AI was McCullouch and Pitts' 1943 formal design for Turing-complete "artificial neurons".

By the 1950s, two visions for how to achieve machine intelligence emerged. One vision, known as Symbolic AI or GOFAI, was to use computers to create a symbolic representation of the world and systems that could reason about the world. Proponents included Allen Newell, Herbert A. Simon, and Marvin Minsky. Closely associated with this approach was the "heuristic search" approach, which likened intelligence to a problem of exploring a space of possibilities for answers.

The second vision, known as the connectionist approach, sought to achieve intelligence through learning. Proponents of this approach, most prominently Frank Rosenblatt, sought to connect Perceptron in ways inspired by connections of neurons. James Manyika and others have compared the two approaches to the mind (Symbolic AI) and the brain (connectionist). Manyika argues that symbolic approaches dominated the push for artificial intelligence in this period, due in part to its connection to intellectual traditions of Descartes, Boole, Gottlob Frege, Bertrand Russell, and others. Connectionist approaches based on cybernetics or artificial neural networks were pushed to the background but have gained new prominence in recent decades.

The field of AI research was born at a workshop at Dartmouth College in 1956. The attendees became the founders and leaders of AI research. They and their students produced programs that the press described as "astonishing": computers were learning checkers strategies, solving word problems in algebra, proving logical theorems and speaking English.

By the middle of the 1960s, research in the U.S. was heavily funded by the Department of Defense and laboratories had been established around the world.

Researchers in the 1960s and the 1970s were convinced that symbolic approaches would eventually succeed in creating a machine with artificial general intelligence and considered this the goal of their field. Herbert Simon predicted, "machines will be capable, within twenty years, of doing any work a man can do". Marvin Minsky agreed, writing, "within a generation ... the problem of creating 'artificial intelligence' will substantially be solved".

They had failed to recognize the difficulty of some of the remaining tasks. Progress slowed and in 1974, in response to the criticism of Sir James Lighthill and ongoing pressure from the US Congress to fund more productive projects, both the U.S. and British governments cut off exploratory research in AI. The next few years would later be called an "AI winter", a period when obtaining funding for AI projects was difficult.

In the early 1980s, AI research was revived by the commercial success of expert systems, a form of AI program that simulated the knowledge and analytical skills of human experts. By 1985, the market for AI had reached over a billion dollars. At the same time, Japan's fifth generation computer project inspired the U.S. and British governments to restore funding for academic research. However, beginning with the collapse of the Lisp Machine market in 1987, AI once again fell into disrepute, and a second, longer-lasting winter began.

Many researchers began to doubt that the symbolic approach would be able to imitate all the processes of human cognition, especially perception, robotics, learning and pattern recognition. A number of researchers began to look into "sub-symbolic" approaches to specific AI problems. Robotics researchers, such as Rodney Brooks, rejected symbolic AI and focused on the basic engineering problems that would allow robots to move, survive, and learn their environment.

Interest in neural networks and "connectionism" was revived by Geoffrey Hinton, David Rumelhart and others in the middle of the 1980s. Soft computing tools were developed in the 1980s, such as neural networks, fuzzy systems, Grey system theory, evolutionary computation and many tools drawn from statistics or mathematical optimization.

AI gradually restored its reputation in the late 1990s and early 21st century by finding specific solutions to specific problems. The narrow focus allowed researchers to produce verifiable results, exploit more mathematical methods, and collaborate with other fields (such as statistics, economics and mathematics). By 2000, solutions developed by AI researchers were being widely used, although in the 1990s they were rarely described as "artificial intelligence".

Faster computers, algorithmic improvements, and access to large amounts of data enabled advances in machine learning and perception; data-hungry deep learning methods started to dominate accuracy benchmarks around 2012. According to Bloomberg's Jack Clark, 2015 was a landmark year for artificial intelligence, with the number of software projects that use AI within Google increased from a "sporadic usage" in 2012 to more than 2,700 projects. He attributed this to an increase in affordable neural networks, due to a rise in cloud computing infrastructure and to an increase in research tools and datasets.

In a 2017 survey, one in five companies reported they had "incorporated AI in some offerings or processes". The amount of research into AI (measured by total publications) increased by 50% in the years 2015–2019.

Numerous academic researchers became concerned that AI was no longer pursuing the original goal of creating versatile, fully intelligent machines. Much of current research involves statistical AI, which is overwhelmingly used to solve specific problems, even highly successful techniques such as deep learning. This concern has led to the subfield of artificial general intelligence (or "AGI"), which had several well-funded institutions by the 2010s.

Goals 
The general problem of simulating (or creating) intelligence has been broken down into sub-problems. These consist of particular traits or capabilities that researchers expect an intelligent system to display. The traits described below have received the most attention.

Reasoning, problem-solving 

Early researchers developed algorithms that imitated step-by-step reasoning that humans use when they solve puzzles or make logical deductions. By the late 1980s and 1990s, AI research had developed methods for dealing with uncertain or incomplete information, employing concepts from probability and economics.

Many of these algorithms proved to be insufficient for solving large reasoning problems because they experienced a "combinatorial explosion": they became exponentially slower as the problems grew larger. Even humans rarely use the step-by-step deduction that early AI research could model. They solve most of their problems using fast, intuitive judgments.

Knowledge representation 

Knowledge representation and knowledge engineering allow AI programs to answer questions intelligently and make deductions about real-world facts.

A representation of "what exists" is an ontology: the set of objects, relations, concepts, and properties formally described so that software agents can interpret them. The most general ontologies are called upper ontologies, which attempt to provide a foundation for all other knowledge and act as mediators between domain ontologies that cover specific knowledge about a particular knowledge domain (field of interest or area of concern). A truly intelligent program would also need access to commonsense knowledge; the set of facts that an average person knows. The semantics of an ontology is typically represented in description logic, such as the Web Ontology Language.

AI research has developed tools to represent specific domains, such as objects, properties, categories and relations between objects; situations, events, states and time; causes and effects; knowledge about knowledge (what we know about what other people know);. default reasoning (things that humans assume are true until they are told differently and will remain true even when other facts are changing); as well as other domains. Among the most difficult problems in AI are: the breadth of commonsense knowledge (the number of atomic facts that the average person knows is enormous); and the sub-symbolic form of most commonsense knowledge (much of what people know is not represented as "facts" or "statements" that they could express verbally).

Formal knowledge representations are used in content-based indexing and retrieval, scene interpretation, clinical decision support, knowledge discovery (mining "interesting" and actionable inferences from large databases), and other areas.

Learning 

Machine learning (ML), a fundamental concept of AI research since the field's inception, is the study of computer algorithms that improve automatically through experience.

Unsupervised learning finds patterns in a stream of input.

Supervised learning requires a human to label the input data first, and comes in two main varieties: classification and numerical regression. Classification is used to determine what category something belongs in – the program sees a number of examples of things from several categories and will learn to classify new inputs. Regression is the attempt to produce a function that describes the relationship between inputs and outputs and predicts how the outputs should change as the inputs change. Both classifiers and regression learners can be viewed as "function approximators" trying to learn an unknown (possibly implicit) function; for example, a spam classifier can be viewed as learning a function that maps from the text of an email to one of two categories, "spam" or "not spam".

In reinforcement learning the agent is rewarded for good responses and punished for bad ones. The agent classifies its responses to form a strategy for operating in its problem space.

Transfer learning is when the knowledge gained from one problem is applied to a new problem.

Computational learning theory can assess learners by computational complexity, by sample complexity (how much data is required), or by other notions of optimization.

Natural language processing 

Natural language processing (NLP)
allows machines to read and understand human language. A sufficiently powerful natural language processing system would enable natural-language user interfaces and the acquisition of knowledge directly from human-written sources, such as newswire texts. Some straightforward applications of NLP include information retrieval, question answering and machine translation.

Symbolic AI used formal syntax to translate the deep structure of sentences into logic. This failed to produce useful applications, due to the intractability of logic and the breadth of commonsense knowledge. Modern statistical techniques include co-occurrence frequencies (how often one word appears near another), "Keyword spotting" (searching for a particular word to retrieve information), transformer-based deep learning (which finds patterns in text), and others. They have achieved acceptable accuracy at the page or paragraph level, and, by 2019, could generate coherent text.

Perception 

Machine perception
is the ability to use input from sensors (such as cameras, microphones, wireless signals, and active lidar, sonar, radar, and tactile sensors) to deduce aspects of the world. Applications include speech recognition,
facial recognition, and object recognition.
Computer vision is the ability to analyze visual input.

Social intelligence 

Affective computing is an interdisciplinary umbrella that comprises systems that recognize, interpret, process or simulate human feeling, emotion and mood.
For example, some virtual assistants are programmed to speak conversationally or even to banter humorously; it makes them appear more sensitive to the emotional dynamics of human interaction, or to otherwise facilitate human–computer interaction.
However, this tends to give naïve users an unrealistic conception of how intelligent existing computer agents actually are. Moderate successes related to affective computing include textual sentiment analysis and, more recently, multimodal sentiment analysis), wherein AI classifies the affects displayed by a videotaped subject.

General intelligence 

A machine with general intelligence can solve a wide variety of problems with breadth and versatility similar to human intelligence. There are several competing ideas about how to develop artificial general intelligence. Hans Moravec and Marvin Minsky argue that work in different individual domains can be incorporated into an advanced multi-agent system or cognitive architecture with general intelligence.
Pedro Domingos hopes that there is a conceptually straightforward, but mathematically difficult, "master algorithm" that could lead to AGI.
Others believe that anthropomorphic features like an artificial brain
or simulated child development
will someday reach a critical point where general intelligence emerges.

Tools

Search and optimization 

AI can solve many problems by intelligently searching through many possible solutions. Reasoning can be reduced to performing a search. For example, logical proof can be viewed as searching for a path that leads from premises to conclusions, where each step is the application of an inference rule. Planning algorithms search through trees of goals and subgoals, attempting to find a path to a target goal, a process called means-ends analysis. Robotics algorithms for moving limbs and grasping objects use local searches in configuration space.

Simple exhaustive searches
are rarely sufficient for most real-world problems: the search space (the number of places to search) quickly grows to astronomical numbers. The result is a search that is too slow or never completes. The solution, for many problems, is to use "heuristics" or "rules of thumb" that prioritize choices in favor of those more likely to reach a goal and to do so in a shorter number of steps. In some search methodologies, heuristics can also serve to eliminate some choices unlikely to lead to a goal (called "pruning the search tree"). Heuristics supply the program with a "best guess" for the path on which the solution lies.
Heuristics limit the search for solutions into a smaller sample size.

A very different kind of search came to prominence in the 1990s, based on the mathematical theory of optimization. For many problems, it is possible to begin the search with some form of a guess and then refine the guess incrementally until no more refinements can be made. These algorithms can be visualized as blind hill climbing: we begin the search at a random point on the landscape, and then, by jumps or steps, we keep moving our guess uphill, until we reach the top. Other related optimization algorithms include random optimization, beam search and metaheuristics like simulated annealing. Evolutionary computation uses a form of optimization search. For example, they may begin with a population of organisms (the guesses) and then allow them to mutate and recombine, selecting only the fittest to survive each generation (refining the guesses). Classic evolutionary algorithms include genetic algorithms, gene expression programming, and genetic programming. Alternatively, distributed search processes can coordinate via swarm intelligence algorithms. Two popular swarm algorithms used in search are particle swarm optimization (inspired by bird flocking) and ant colony optimization (inspired by ant trails).

Logic 

Logic
is used for knowledge representation and problem-solving, but it can be applied to other problems as well. For example, the satplan algorithm uses logic for planning
and inductive logic programming is a method for learning.

Several different forms of logic are used in AI research. Propositional logic involves truth functions such as "or" and "not". First-order logic
adds quantifiers and predicates and can express facts about objects, their properties, and their relations with each other. Fuzzy logic assigns a "degree of truth" (between 0 and 1) to vague statements such as "Alice is old" (or rich, or tall, or hungry), that are too linguistically imprecise to be completely true or false.
Default logics, non-monotonic logics and circumscription are forms of logic designed to help with default reasoning and the qualification problem.
Several extensions of logic have been designed to handle specific domains of knowledge, such as description logics;
situation calculus, event calculus and fluent calculus (for representing events and time);
causal calculus;
belief calculus (belief revision); and modal logics.
Logics to model contradictory or inconsistent statements arising in multi-agent systems have also been designed, such as paraconsistent logics.

Probabilistic methods for uncertain reasoning 

Many problems in AI (including in reasoning, planning, learning, perception, and robotics) require the agent to operate with incomplete or uncertain information. AI researchers have devised a number of tools to solve these problems using methods from probability theory and economics.
Bayesian networks
are a very general tool that can be used for various problems, including reasoning (using the Bayesian inference algorithm),
learning (using the expectation-maximization algorithm),
planning (using decision networks) and perception (using dynamic Bayesian networks).
Probabilistic algorithms can also be used for filtering, prediction, smoothing and finding explanations for streams of data, helping perception systems to analyze processes that occur over time (e.g., hidden Markov models or Kalman filters).

A key concept from the science of economics is "utility", a measure of how valuable something is to an intelligent agent. Precise mathematical tools have been developed that analyze how an agent can make choices and plan, using decision theory, decision analysis,
and information value theory. These tools include models such as Markov decision processes, dynamic decision networks, game theory and mechanism design.

Classifiers and statistical learning methods 

The simplest AI applications can be divided into two types: classifiers ("if shiny then diamond") and controllers ("if diamond then pick up"). Controllers do, however, also classify conditions before inferring actions, and therefore classification forms a central part of many AI systems. Classifiers are functions that use pattern matching to determine the closest match. They can be tuned according to examples, making them very attractive for use in AI. These examples are known as observations or patterns. In supervised learning, each pattern belongs to a certain predefined class. A class is a decision that has to be made. All the observations combined with their class labels are known as a data set. When a new observation is received, that observation is classified based on previous experience.

A classifier can be trained in various ways; there are many statistical and machine learning approaches.
The decision tree is the simplest and most widely used symbolic machine learning algorithm.
K-nearest neighbor algorithm was the most widely used analogical AI until the mid-1990s.
Kernel methods such as the support vector machine (SVM) displaced k-nearest neighbor in the 1990s.
The naive Bayes classifier is reportedly the "most widely used learner" at Google, due in part to its scalability.
Neural networks are also used for classification.

Classifier performance depends greatly on the characteristics of the data to be classified, such as the dataset size, distribution of samples across classes, dimensionality, and the level of noise. Model-based classifiers perform well if the assumed model is an extremely good fit for the actual data. Otherwise, if no matching model is available, and if accuracy (rather than speed or scalability) is the sole concern, conventional wisdom is that discriminative classifiers (especially SVM) tend to be more accurate than model-based classifiers such as "naive Bayes" on most practical data sets.

Artificial neural networks 

Neural networks
were inspired by the architecture of neurons in the human brain. A simple "neuron" N accepts input from other neurons, each of which, when activated (or "fired"), casts a weighted "vote" for or against whether neuron N should itself activate. Learning requires an algorithm to adjust these weights based on the training data; one simple algorithm (dubbed "fire together, wire together") is to increase the weight between two connected neurons when the activation of one triggers the successful activation of another. Neurons have a continuous spectrum of activation; in addition, neurons can process inputs in a nonlinear way rather than weighing straightforward votes.

Modern neural networks model complex relationships between inputs and outputs and find patterns in data. They can learn continuous functions and even digital logical operations. Neural networks can be viewed as a type of mathematical optimization – they perform gradient descent on a multi-dimensional topology that was created by training the network. The most common training technique is the backpropagation algorithm.
Other learning techniques for neural networks are Hebbian learning ("fire together, wire together"), GMDH or competitive learning.

The main categories of networks are acyclic or feedforward neural networks (where the signal passes in only one direction) and recurrent neural networks (which allow feedback and short-term memories of previous input events). Among the most popular feedforward networks are perceptrons, multi-layer perceptrons and radial basis networks.

Deep learning 

Deep learning
uses several layers of neurons between the network's inputs and outputs. The multiple layers can progressively extract higher-level features from the raw input. For example, in image processing, lower layers may identify edges, while higher layers may identify the concepts relevant to a human such as digits or letters or faces. Deep learning has drastically improved the performance of programs in many important subfields of artificial intelligence, including computer vision, speech recognition, image classification and others.

Deep learning often uses convolutional neural networks for many or all of its layers. In a convolutional layer, each neuron receives input from only a restricted area of the previous layer called the neuron's receptive field. This can substantially reduce the number of weighted connections between neurons, and creates a hierarchy similar to the organization of the animal visual cortex.

In a recurrent neural network (RNN) the signal will propagate through a layer more than once;
thus, an RNN is an example of deep learning.
RNNs can be trained by gradient descent,
however long-term gradients which are back-propagated can "vanish" (that is, they can tend to zero) or "explode" (that is, they can tend to infinity), known as the vanishing gradient problem.
The long short term memory (LSTM) technique can prevent this in most cases.

Specialized languages and hardware 

Specialized languages for artificial intelligence have been developed, such as Lisp, Prolog, TensorFlow and many others. Hardware developed for AI includes AI accelerators and neuromorphic computing.

Applications 

AI is relevant to any intellectual task.
Modern artificial intelligence techniques are pervasive and are too numerous to list here.
Frequently, when a technique reaches mainstream use, it is no longer considered artificial intelligence; this phenomenon is described as the AI effect.

In the 2010s, AI applications were at the heart of the most commercially successful areas of computing, and have become a ubiquitous feature of daily life. AI is used in search engines (such as Google Search),
targeting online advertisements, recommendation systems (offered by Netflix, YouTube or Amazon),
driving internet traffic, targeted advertising (AdSense, Facebook),
virtual assistants (such as Siri or Alexa), autonomous vehicles (including drones, ADAS and self-driving cars),
automatic language translation (Microsoft Translator, Google Translate),
facial recognition (Apple's Face ID or Microsoft's DeepFace),
image labeling (used by Facebook, Apple's iPhoto and TikTok)
, spam filtering and chatbots (such as Chat GPT).

There are also thousands of successful AI applications used to solve problems for specific industries or institutions. A few examples are energy storage, deepfakes, medical diagnosis, military logistics, or supply chain management.

Game playing has been a test of AI's strength since the 1950s. Deep Blue became the first computer chess-playing system to beat a reigning world chess champion, Garry Kasparov, on 11 May 1997. In 2011, in a Jeopardy! quiz show exhibition match, IBM's question answering system, Watson, defeated the two greatest Jeopardy! champions, Brad Rutter and Ken Jennings, by a significant margin.
In March 2016, AlphaGo won 4 out of 5 games of Go in a match with Go champion Lee Sedol, becoming the first computer Go-playing system to beat a professional Go player without handicaps. Other programs handle imperfect-information games; such as for poker at a superhuman level, Pluribus and Cepheus. DeepMind in the 2010s developed a "generalized artificial intelligence" that could learn many diverse Atari games on its own.

By 2020, Natural Language Processing systems such as the enormous GPT-3 (then by far the largest artificial neural network) were matching human performance on pre-existing benchmarks, albeit without the system attaining a commonsense understanding of the contents of the benchmarks.
DeepMind's AlphaFold 2 (2020) demonstrated the ability to approximate, in hours rather than months, the 3D structure of a protein.
Other applications predict the result of judicial decisions, create art (such as poetry or painting) and prove mathematical theorems.

AI content detector tools are software applications that use artificial intelligence (AI) algorithms to analyze and detect specific types of content in digital media, such as text, images, and videos. These tools are commonly used to identify inappropriate content, such as speech errors, violent or sexual images, and spam, among others.

Some benefits of using AI content detector tools include improved efficiency and accuracy in detecting inappropriate content, increased safety and security for users, and reduced legal and reputational risks for websites and platforms.

Smart traffic lights

Smart traffic lights have been developed at Carnegie Mellon since 2009.  Professor Stephen Smith has started a company since then Surtrac that has installed smart traffic control systems in 22 cities.  It costs about $20,000 per intersection to install. Drive time has been reduced by 25% and traffic jam waiting time has been reduced by 40% at the intersections it has been installed.

Intellectual property 

In 2019, WIPO reported that AI was the most prolific emerging technology in terms of the number of patent applications and granted patents, the Internet of things was estimated to be the largest in terms of market size. It was followed, again in market size, by big data technologies, robotics, AI, 3D printing and the fifth generation of mobile services (5G). Since AI emerged in the 1950s, 340,000 AI-related patent applications were filed by innovators and 1.6 million scientific papers have been published by researchers, with the majority of all AI-related patent filings published since 2013. Companies represent 26 out of the top 30 AI patent applicants, with universities or public research organizations accounting for the remaining four. The ratio of scientific papers to inventions has significantly decreased from 8:1 in 2010 to 3:1 in 2016, which is attributed to be indicative of a shift from theoretical research to the use of AI technologies in commercial products and services. Machine learning is the dominant AI technique disclosed in patents and is included in more than one-third of all identified inventions (134,777 machine learning patents filed for a total of 167,038 AI patents filed in 2016), with computer vision being the most popular functional application. AI-related patents not only disclose AI techniques and applications, they often also refer to an application field or industry. Twenty application fields were identified in 2016 and included, in order of magnitude: telecommunications (15 percent), transportation (15 percent), life and medical sciences (12 percent), and personal devices, computing and human–computer interaction (11 percent). Other sectors included banking, entertainment, security, industry and manufacturing, agriculture, and networks (including social networks, smart cities and the Internet of things). IBM has the largest portfolio of AI patents with 8,290 patent applications, followed by Microsoft with 5,930 patent applications.

Philosophy

Defining artificial intelligence 

Alan Turing wrote in 1950 "I propose to consider the question 'can machines think'?"
He advised changing the question from whether a machine "thinks", to "whether or not it is possible for machinery to show intelligent behaviour".
He devised the Turing test, which measures the ability of a machine to simulate human conversation. Since we can only observe the behavior of the machine, it does not matter if it is "actually" thinking or literally has a "mind". Turing notes that we can not determine these things about other people but "it is usual to have a polite convention that everyone thinks"

Russell and Norvig agree with Turing that AI must be defined in terms of "acting" and not "thinking". However, they are critical that the test compares machines to people. "Aeronautical engineering texts," they wrote, "do not define the goal of their field as making 'machines that fly so exactly like pigeons that they can fool other pigeons. AI founder John McCarthy agreed, writing that "Artificial intelligence is not, by definition, simulation of human intelligence".

McCarthy defines intelligence as "the computational part of the ability to achieve goals in the world." Another AI founder, Marvin Minsky similarly defines it as "the ability to solve hard problems". These definitions view intelligence in terms of well-defined problems with well-defined solutions, where both the difficulty of the problem and the performance of the program are direct measures of the "intelligence" of the machine—and no other philosophical discussion is required, or may not even be possible.

A definition that has also been adopted by Google - major practitionary in the field of AI.
This definition stipulated the ability of systems to synthesize information as the manifestation of intelligence, similar to the way it is defined in biological intelligence.

Evaluating approaches to AI 

No established unifying theory or paradigm has guided AI research for most of its history. The unprecedented success of statistical machine learning in the 2010s eclipsed all other approaches (so much so that some sources, especially in the business world, use the term "artificial intelligence" to mean "machine learning with neural networks"). This approach is mostly sub-symbolic, neat, soft and narrow (see below). Critics argue that these questions may have to be revisited by future generations of AI researchers.

Symbolic AI and its limits

Symbolic AI (or "GOFAI") simulated the high-level conscious reasoning that people use when they solve puzzles, express legal reasoning and do mathematics. They were highly successful at "intelligent" tasks such as algebra or IQ tests. In the 1960s, Newell and Simon proposed the physical symbol systems hypothesis: "A physical symbol system has the necessary and sufficient means of general intelligent action."

However, the symbolic approach failed on many tasks that humans solve easily, such as learning, recognizing an object or commonsense reasoning. Moravec's paradox is the discovery that high-level "intelligent" tasks were easy for AI, but low level "instinctive" tasks were extremely difficult.
Philosopher Hubert Dreyfus had argued since the 1960s that human expertise depends on unconscious instinct rather than conscious symbol manipulation, and on having a "feel" for the situation, rather than explicit symbolic knowledge.
Although his arguments had been ridiculed and ignored when they were first presented, eventually, AI research came to agree.

The issue is not resolved: sub-symbolic reasoning can make many of the same inscrutable mistakes that human intuition does, such as algorithmic bias. Critics such as Noam Chomsky argue continuing research into symbolic AI will still be necessary to attain general intelligence, in part because sub-symbolic AI is a move away from explainable AI: it can be difficult or impossible to understand why a modern statistical AI program made a particular decision. The emerging field of neuro-symbolic artificial intelligence attempts to bridge the two approaches.

Neat vs. scruffy 

"Neats" hope that intelligent behavior is described using simple, elegant principles (such as logic, optimization, or neural networks). "Scruffies" expect that it necessarily requires solving a large number of unrelated problems (especially in areas like common sense reasoning). This issue was actively discussed in the 70s and 80s,
but in the 1990s mathematical methods and solid scientific standards became the norm, a transition that Russell and Norvig termed "the victory of the neats".

Soft vs. hard computing 

Finding a provably correct or optimal solution is intractable for many important problems. Soft computing is a set of techniques, including genetic algorithms, fuzzy logic and neural networks, that are tolerant of imprecision, uncertainty, partial truth and approximation. Soft computing was introduced in the late 80s and most successful AI programs in the 21st century are examples of soft computing with neural networks.

Narrow vs. general AI 

AI researchers are divided as to whether to pursue the goals of artificial general intelligence and superintelligence (general AI) directly or to solve as many specific problems as possible (narrow AI) in hopes these solutions will lead indirectly to the field's long-term goals.
General intelligence is difficult to define and difficult to measure, and modern AI has had more verifiable successes by focusing on specific problems with specific solutions. The experimental sub-field of artificial general intelligence studies this area exclusively.

Machine consciousness, sentience and mind 

The philosophy of mind does not know whether a machine can have a mind, consciousness and mental states, in the same sense that human beings do. This issue considers the internal experiences of the machine, rather than its external behavior. Mainstream AI research considers this issue irrelevant because it does not affect the goals of the field. Stuart Russell and Peter Norvig observe that most AI researchers "don't care about the [philosophy of AI] – as long as the program works, they don't care whether you call it a simulation of intelligence or real intelligence." However, the question has become central to the philosophy of mind. It is also typically the central question at issue in artificial intelligence in fiction.

Consciousness 

David Chalmers identified two problems in understanding the mind, which he named the "hard" and "easy" problems of consciousness. The easy problem is understanding how the brain processes signals, makes plans and controls behavior. The hard problem is explaining how this feels or why it should feel like anything at all. Human information processing is easy to explain, however, human subjective experience is difficult to explain. For example, it is easy to imagine a color-blind person who has learned to identify which objects in their field of view are red, but it is not clear what would be required for the person to know what red looks like.

Computationalism and functionalism 

Computationalism is the position in the philosophy of mind that the human mind is an information processing system and that thinking is a form of computing. Computationalism argues that the relationship between mind and body is similar or identical to the relationship between software and hardware and thus may be a solution to the mind-body problem. This philosophical position was inspired by the work of AI researchers and cognitive scientists in the 1960s and was originally proposed by philosophers Jerry Fodor and Hilary Putnam.

Philosopher John Searle characterized this position as "strong AI": "The appropriately programmed computer with the right inputs and outputs would thereby have a mind in exactly the same sense human beings have minds."
Searle counters this assertion with his Chinese room argument, which attempts to show that, even if a machine perfectly simulates human behavior, there is still no reason to suppose it also has a mind.

Robot rights 

If a machine has a mind and subjective experience, then it may also have sentience (the ability to feel), and if so, then it could also suffer, and thus it would be entitled to certain rights.
Any hypothetical robot rights would lie on a spectrum with animal rights and human rights.
This issue has been considered in fiction for centuries,
and is now being considered by, for example, California's Institute for the Future; however, critics argue that the discussion is premature.

Future

Superintelligence 

A superintelligence, hyperintelligence, or superhuman intelligence, is a hypothetical agent that would possess intelligence far surpassing that of the brightest and most gifted human mind. Superintelligence may also refer to the form or degree of intelligence possessed by such an agent.

If research into artificial general intelligence produced sufficiently intelligent software, it might be able to reprogram and improve itself. The improved software would be even better at improving itself, leading to recursive self-improvement.
Its intelligence would increase exponentially in an intelligence explosion and could dramatically surpass humans. Science fiction writer Vernor Vinge named this scenario the "singularity".
Because it is difficult or impossible to know the limits of intelligence or the capabilities of superintelligent machines, the technological singularity is an occurrence beyond which events are unpredictable or even unfathomable.

Robot designer Hans Moravec, cyberneticist Kevin Warwick, and inventor Ray Kurzweil have predicted that humans and machines will merge in the future into cyborgs that are more capable and powerful than either. This idea, called transhumanism, has roots in Aldous Huxley and Robert Ettinger.

Edward Fredkin argues that "artificial intelligence is the next stage in evolution", an idea first proposed by Samuel Butler's "Darwin among the Machines" as far back as 1863, and expanded upon by George Dyson in his book of the same name in 1998.

Risks

Technological unemployment 

In the past, technology has tended to increase rather than reduce total employment, but economists acknowledge that "we're in uncharted territory" with AI.
A survey of economists showed disagreement about whether the increasing use of robots and AI will cause a substantial increase in long-term unemployment, but they generally agree that it could be a net benefit if productivity gains are redistributed.
Subjective estimates of the risk vary widely; for example, Michael Osborne and Carl Benedikt Frey estimate 47% of U.S. jobs are at "high risk" of potential automation, while an OECD report classifies only 9% of U.S. jobs as "high risk".

Unlike previous waves of automation, many middle-class jobs may be eliminated by artificial intelligence; The Economist states that "the worry that AI could do to white-collar jobs what steam power did to blue-collar ones during the Industrial Revolution" is "worth taking seriously".
Jobs at extreme risk range from paralegals to fast food cooks, while job demand is likely to increase for care-related professions ranging from personal healthcare to the clergy.

Bad actors and weaponized AI 

AI provides a number of tools that are particularly useful for authoritarian governments: smart spyware, face recognition and voice recognition allow widespread surveillance; such surveillance allows machine learning to classify potential enemies of the state and can prevent them from hiding; recommendation systems can precisely target propaganda and misinformation for maximum effect; deepfakes aid in producing misinformation; advanced AI can make centralized decision making more competitive with liberal and decentralized systems such as markets.

Terrorists, criminals and rogue states may use other forms of weaponized AI such as advanced digital warfare and lethal autonomous weapons. By 2015, over fifty countries were reported to be researching battlefield robots.

Machine-learning AI is also able to design tens of thousands of toxic molecules in a matter of hours.

Algorithmic bias 

AI programs can become biased after learning from real-world data. It is not typically introduced by the system designers but is learned by the program, and thus the programmers are often unaware that the bias exists.
Bias can be inadvertently introduced by the way training data is selected.
It can also emerge from correlations: AI is used to classify individuals into groups and then make predictions assuming that the individual will resemble other members of the group. In some cases, this assumption may be unfair. An example of this is COMPAS, a commercial program widely used by U.S. courts to assess the likelihood of a defendant becoming a recidivist. ProPublica claims that the COMPAS-assigned recidivism risk level of black defendants is far more likely to be overestimated than that of white defendants, despite the fact that the program was not told the races of the defendants.

Health equity issues may also be exacerbated when many-to-many mapping are done without taking steps to ensure equity for populations at risk for bias. At this time equity-focused tools and regulations are not in place to ensure equity application representation and usage. Other examples where algorithmic bias can lead to unfair outcomes are when AI is used for credit rating or hiring.

At its 2022 Conference on Fairness, Accountability, and Transparency (ACM FAccT 2022) the Association for Computing Machinery, in Seoul, South Korea, presented and published findings recommending that until AI and robotics systems are demonstrated to be free of bias mistakes, they are unsafe and the use of self-learning neural networks trained on vast, unregulated sources of flawed internet data should be curtailed.

Existential risk 

Superintelligent AI may be able to improve itself to the point that humans could not control it. This could, as physicist Stephen Hawking puts it, "spell the end of the human race". Philosopher Nick Bostrom argues that sufficiently intelligent AI, if it chooses actions based on achieving some goal, will exhibit convergent behavior such as acquiring resources or protecting itself from being shut down. If this AI's goals do not fully reflect humanity's, it might need to harm humanity to acquire more resources or prevent itself from being shut down, ultimately to better achieve its goal. He concludes that AI poses a risk to mankind, however humble or "friendly" its stated goals might be.
Political scientist Charles T. Rubin argues that "any sufficiently advanced benevolence may be indistinguishable from malevolence." Humans should not assume machines or robots would treat us favorably because there is no a priori reason to believe that they would share our system of morality.

The opinion of experts and industry insiders is mixed, with sizable fractions both concerned and unconcerned by risk from eventual superhumanly-capable AI.
Stephen Hawking, Microsoft founder Bill Gates, history professor Yuval Noah Harari, and SpaceX founder Elon Musk have all expressed serious misgivings about the future of AI.
Prominent tech titans including Peter Thiel (Amazon Web Services) and Musk have committed more than $1 billion to nonprofit companies that champion responsible AI development, such as OpenAI and the Future of Life Institute.
Mark Zuckerberg (CEO, Facebook) has said that artificial intelligence is helpful in its current form and will continue to assist humans.
Other experts argue is that the risks are far enough in the future to not be worth researching,
or that humans will be valuable from the perspective of a superintelligent machine.
Rodney Brooks, in particular, has said that "malevolent" AI is still centuries away.

Copyright 
AI's decisions making abilities raises the questions of legal responsibility and copyright status of created works. This issues are being refined in various jurisdictions.

Ethical machines 

Friendly AI are machines that have been designed from the beginning to minimize risks and to make choices that benefit humans. Eliezer Yudkowsky, who coined the term, argues that developing friendly AI should be a higher research priority: it may require a large investment and it must be completed before AI becomes an existential risk.

Machines with intelligence have the potential to use their intelligence to make ethical decisions. The field of machine ethics provides machines with ethical principles and procedures for resolving ethical dilemmas.
Machine ethics is also called machine morality, computational ethics or computational morality,
and was founded at an AAAI symposium in 2005.

Other approaches include Wendell Wallach's "artificial moral agents"
and Stuart J. Russell's three principles for developing provably beneficial machines.

Regulation 

The regulation of artificial intelligence is the development of public sector policies and laws for promoting and regulating artificial intelligence (AI); it is therefore related to the broader regulation of algorithms.
The regulatory and policy landscape for AI is an emerging issue in jurisdictions globally.
Between 2016 and 2020, more than 30 countries adopted dedicated strategies for AI.
Most EU member states had released national AI strategies, as had Canada, China, India, Japan, Mauritius, the Russian Federation, Saudi Arabia, United Arab Emirates, US and Vietnam. Others were in the process of elaborating their own AI strategy, including Bangladesh, Malaysia and Tunisia.
The Global Partnership on Artificial Intelligence was launched in June 2020, stating a need for AI to be developed in accordance with human rights and democratic values, to ensure public confidence and trust in the technology. Henry Kissinger, Eric Schmidt, and Daniel Huttenlocher published a joint statement in November 2021 calling for a government commission to regulate AI.

In fiction 

Thought-capable artificial beings have appeared as storytelling devices since antiquity,
and have been a persistent theme in science fiction.

A common trope in these works began with Mary Shelley's Frankenstein, where a human creation becomes a threat to its masters. This includes such works as Arthur C. Clarke's and Stanley Kubrick's 2001: A Space Odyssey (both 1968), with HAL 9000, the murderous computer in charge of the Discovery One spaceship, as well as The Terminator (1984) and The Matrix (1999). In contrast, the rare loyal robots such as Gort from The Day the Earth Stood Still (1951) and Bishop from Aliens (1986) are less prominent in popular culture.

Isaac Asimov introduced the Three Laws of Robotics in many books and stories, most notably the "Multivac" series about a super-intelligent computer of the same name. Asimov's laws are often brought up during lay discussions of machine ethics;
while almost all artificial intelligence researchers are familiar with Asimov's laws through popular culture, they generally consider the laws useless for many reasons, one of which is their ambiguity.

Transhumanism (the merging of humans and machines) is explored in the manga Ghost in the Shell and the science-fiction series Dune.

Several works use AI to force us to confront the fundamental question of what makes us human, showing us artificial beings that have the ability to feel, and thus to suffer. This appears in Karel Čapek's R.U.R., the films A.I. Artificial Intelligence and Ex Machina, as well as the novel Do Androids Dream of Electric Sheep?, by Philip K. Dick. Dick considers the idea that our understanding of human subjectivity is altered by technology created with artificial intelligence.

See also 
 
 
 Artificial intelligence in healthcare - Machine-learning algorithms and software in the analysis, presentation, and comprehension of complex medical and health care data
 
 
 
 
 
 
 
 
 
 
 
 
 Data sources – The list of data sources for study and research

Explanatory notes

References

AI textbooks 
These were the four the most widely used AI textbooks in 2008:

 
 
 .
 

Later editions.
 .
 

The two most widely used textbooks in 2021.Open Syllabus: Explorer

History of AI 

 .
 .

Other sources 

 
 
 
 
 
  was introduced by Kunihiko Fukushima in 1980.
 
 
 
 
 
 
 
 
 
 
 
 
 
 
 
 
 
 
 
 
 
 
 |
 
 
 
 
 
 
 
 
 
 
 
 
 
 
 
 
 
 
 
 
 
 
 
 
 
 
 
 
 
 
 
 
 
 
 
 
 
 
 
 
 
 
 
 
 
 
 
 
 
 
 
 
 
 
 
 
 
 
 
 
 
 
 
 
 
 
 
 
 
 
 
 
 
 
 
 
 
 
 
 
 
 
 
 
 
 
 
 
 
 
 
 
 
 
 
 
 
 
 
 
 
 
 
 
 
 
 
 
 
 
 
 
 
 
 
 
 
 
 
 
 
 
 
 
 
 .
  Presidential Address to the Association for the Advancement of Artificial Intelligence.
 
 
 
 
 
  Later published as
 
 
 
 
 .

Further reading 

 Autor, David H., "Why Are There Still So Many Jobs? The History and Future of Workplace Automation" (2015) 29(3) Journal of Economic Perspectives 3.
 Boden, Margaret, Mind As Machine, Oxford University Press, 2006.
 Cukier, Kenneth, "Ready for Robots? How to Think about the Future of AI", Foreign Affairs, vol. 98, no. 4 (July/August 2019), pp. 192–98. George Dyson, historian of computing, writes (in what might be called "Dyson's Law") that "Any system simple enough to be understandable will not be complicated enough to behave intelligently, while any system complicated enough to behave intelligently will be too complicated to understand." (p. 197.) Computer scientist Alex Pentland writes: "Current AI machine-learning algorithms are, at their core, dead simple stupid. They work, but they work by brute force." (p. 198.)
 Domingos, Pedro, "Our Digital Doubles: AI will serve our species, not control it", Scientific American, vol. 319, no. 3 (September 2018), pp. 88–93.
 Gopnik, Alison, "Making AI More Human: Artificial intelligence has staged a revival by starting to incorporate what we know about how children learn", Scientific American, vol. 316, no. 6 (June 2017), pp. 60–65.
 Halpern, Sue, "The Human Costs of AI" (review of Kate Crawford, Atlas of AI: Power, Politics, and the Planetary Costs of Artificial Intelligence, Yale University Press, 2021, 327 pp.; Simon Chesterman, We, the Robots?: Regulating Artificial Intelligence and the Limits of the Law, Cambridge University Press, 2021, 289 pp.; Keven Roose, Futureproof: 9 Rules for Humans in the Age of Automation, Random House, 217 pp.; Erik J. Larson, The Myth of Artificial Intelligence: Why Computers Can't Think the Way We Do, Belknap Press / Harvard University Press, 312 pp.), The New York Review of Books, vol. LXVIII, no. 16 (21 October 2021), pp. 29–31. "AI training models can replicate entrenched social and cultural biases. [...] Machines only know what they know from the data they have been given. [p. 30.] [A]rtificial general intelligence–machine-based intelligence that matches our own–is beyond the capacity of algorithmic machine learning... 'Your brain is one piece in a broader system which includes your body, your environment, other humans, and culture as a whole.' [E]ven machines that master the tasks they are trained to perform can't jump domains. AIVA, for example, can't drive a car even though it can write music (and wouldn't even be able to do that without Bach and Beethoven [and other composers on which AIVA is trained])." (p. 31.)
 Johnston, John (2008) The Allure of Machinic Life: Cybernetics, Artificial Life, and the New AI, MIT Press.
 Koch, Christof, "Proust among the Machines", Scientific American, vol. 321, no. 6 (December 2019), pp. 46–49. Christof Koch doubts the possibility of "intelligent" machines attaining consciousness, because "[e]ven the most sophisticated brain simulations are unlikely to produce conscious feelings." (p. 48.) According to Koch, "Whether machines can become sentient [is important] for ethical reasons. If computers experience life through their own senses, they cease to be purely a means to an end determined by their usefulness to... humans. Per GNW [the Global Neuronal Workspace theory], they turn from mere objects into subjects... with a point of view.... Once computers' cognitive abilities rival those of humanity, their impulse to push for legal and political rights will become irresistible—the right not to be deleted, not to have their memories wiped clean, not to suffer pain and degradation. The alternative, embodied by IIT [Integrated Information Theory], is that computers will remain only supersophisticated machinery, ghostlike empty shells, devoid of what we value most: the feeling of life itself." (p. 49.)
 Marcus, Gary, "Am I Human?: Researchers need new ways to distinguish artificial intelligence from the natural kind", Scientific American, vol. 316, no. 3 (March 2017), pp. 58–63. A stumbling block to AI has been an incapacity for reliable disambiguation. An example is the "pronoun disambiguation problem": a machine has no way of determining to whom or what a pronoun in a sentence refers. (p. 61.)
 Gary Marcus, "Artificial Confidence: Even the newest, buzziest systems of artificial general intelligence are stymmied by the same old problems", Scientific American, vol. 327, no. 4 (October 2022), pp. 42–45.
 E McGaughey, 'Will Robots Automate Your Job Away? Full Employment, Basic Income, and Economic Democracy' (2018) SSRN, part 2(3) .
 George Musser, "Artificial Imagination: How machines could learn creativity and common sense, among other human qualities", Scientific American, vol. 320, no. 5 (May 2019), pp. 58–63.
 Myers, Courtney Boyd ed. (2009). "The AI Report" . Forbes June 2009
 
 Scharre, Paul, "Killer Apps: The Real Dangers of an AI Arms Race", Foreign Affairs, vol. 98, no. 3 (May/June 2019), pp. 135–44. "Today's AI technologies are powerful but unreliable. Rules-based systems cannot deal with circumstances their programmers did not anticipate. Learning systems are limited by the data on which they were trained. AI failures have already led to tragedy. Advanced autopilot features in cars, although they perform well in some circumstances, have driven cars without warning into trucks, concrete barriers, and parked cars. In the wrong situation, AI systems go from supersmart to superdumb in an instant. When an enemy is trying to manipulate and hack an AI system, the risks are even greater." (p. 140.)
 
 
 
 Sun, R. & Bookman, L. (eds.), Computational Architectures: Integrating Neural and Symbolic Processes. Kluwer Academic Publishers, Needham, MA. 1994.
 Taylor, Paul, "Insanely Complicated, Hopelessly Inadequate" (review of Brian Cantwell Smith, The Promise of Artificial Intelligence: Reckoning and Judgment, MIT, 2019, 157 pp.; Gary Marcus and Ernest Davis, Rebooting AI: Building Artificial Intelligence We Can Trust, Ballantine, 2019, 304 pp.; Judea Pearl and Dana Mackenzie, The Book of Why: The New Science of Cause and Effect, Penguin, 2019, 418 pp.), London Review of Books, vol. 43, no. 2 (21 January 2021), pp. 37–39. Paul Taylor writes (p. 39): "Perhaps there is a limit to what a computer can do without knowing that it is manipulating imperfect representations of an external reality."
 Tooze, Adam, "Democracy and Its Discontents", The New York Review of Books, vol. LXVI, no. 10 (6 June 2019), pp. 52–53, 56–57. "Democracy has no clear answer for the mindless operation of bureaucratic and technological power. We may indeed be witnessing its extension in the form of artificial intelligence and robotics. Likewise, after decades of dire warning, the environmental problem remains fundamentally unaddressed.... Bureaucratic overreach and environmental catastrophe are precisely the kinds of slow-moving existential challenges that democracies deal with very badly.... Finally, there is the threat du jour: corporations and the technologies they promote." (pp. 56–57.)

External links 

 
 
 Artificial Intelligence. BBC Radio 4 discussion with John Agar, Alison Adam & Igor Aleksander (In Our Time, 8 December 2005).

 
Cybernetics
Formal sciences
Data science
Computational neuroscience
Emerging technologies
Unsolved problems in computer science
Computational fields of study